Marz may refer to:

People
 Marz (surname), notable people surnamed either Marz or März
 Marz (rapper), American rapper
 Marz Lovejoy, American hip hop musician and rapper

Places
 Marz, Austria, a town in the district of Mattersburg, Burgenland, Austria
 Marz, East Azerbaijan, a village in East Azerbaijan Province, Iran
 Marz, Kerman, a village in Kerman Province, Iran
 Marz, Khonj, a village in Fars Province, Iran
 Marz, Mazandaran, a village in Mazandaran Province, Iran
 Marz, North Khorasan, a village in North Khorasan Province, Iran
 Marz Rural District, an administrative subdivision of Kerman Province, Iran
 Marz (territorial entity), a first level administrative division of Armenia

See also
 Martz (disambiguation)
 Morz (disambiguation)